Ibai is a Basque male name. Notable people with the name include:

Ibai Azurmendi (born 1999), Spanish cyclist 
Ibai Gómez (born 1989), Spanish footballer
Ibai Llanos (born 1995), Spanish internet celebrity, streamer, and esports announcer
Ibai Salas (born 1991), Spanish cyclist

Basque masculine given names